Cape Fugui, Cape Fukwei, Fukwei Chiao, Fuguei Cape,  or  is a cape located at the northernmost point of the island of Taiwan. It is located in  within the Shimen District in New Taipei City.

Name
Fùguì is the pinyin romanization of the Mandarin pronunciation of its Chinese name  These characters literally mean "rich and noble Cape" but actually transcribe the local Hokkien pronunciation Hù-kùi, used as a transliteration of the Dutch  ("hook; cape").

In the 19th century, it was known as Foki during the period of Qing rule. Under Japanese rule, it was known as Fūki Kaku from the Japanese pronunciation of the same characters. During Taiwan's brief official use of Tongyong Pinyin, it was known as Fuguei.

Geography

Cape Fugui is the northernmost point of Formosa or Taiwan Island and forms one end of Laomei Bay.

The cape under its Japanese name "Fuki Kaku"forms part of the IHO's current definitions of the East and South China Seas. The still unapproved draft of the 4th edition of the Limits of Oceans and Seas amends the name to its pinyin form Fugui but moves the boundary of the South China Sea from Fugui to Taiwan's southern cape Eluan.

Cape Fugui is also considered part of the northern border of the Taiwan Strait.

History
The Japanese administration erected a building on the cape in 1896 as the endpoint of an undersea cable. It was destroyed during the Second World War. The present lighthouse was erected by the Taiwanese government in 1949 to help guide shipping and received its present black-and-white octagonal tower in 1962. It was opened to the public in 2015, but entry is only permitted on the weekends as it remains an active radar station of the Taiwanese Air Force.

Park
Cape Fugui or Fuguijiao Park surrounds the headland. It includes a rocky beach with ventifacts (wind-shaped rocks) and lush tropical vegetation. There is a walking trail around the cape from Fuji Harbor (t, Fùjī Yúgǎng) to Laomei Village and the brick Laomei Maze. Old barracks from the Taiwanese armed forces have been converted into an arts center. In September and October, the park forms part of Shimen District's kite festival.

Transportation
The cape is about  along Provincial Highway 2. It is sometimes inaccessible because of rockslides during heavy rain, as during June 2017.

Gallery

See also
 Cape Fugui Lighthouse
 Cape Eluanbi, the southernmost point on Taiwan

References

Citations

Bibliography
 .
 .
 .
 . 
 .

Fugui
Tourist attractions in New Taipei